Melor Bedia (born September 26, 1979, Russia) is a Chess Champion from Russia. He owned the Grandmaster (GM) title in 2011. In 2016, he was the winner of the 11th Gelendzhik Chess Festival held in Gelendzhik, Russia.

Notable Tournaments

References 

1979 births
Living people
Russian chess players
Chess grandmasters